Presidential elections were held in Somaliland on 13 November 2017, the third direct presidential election since 2003. General elections had been scheduled to be held in Somaliland on 27 March 2017 to elect both the President and House of Representatives, but were initially postponed by six months due to the drought condition in the region. The elections to elect the President and Vice President were eventually held separately on 13 November. Incumbent President Ahmed Mohamed Mohamoud of the Peace, Unity, and Development Party (Kulmiye) did not run for a second term.

The result was a victory for ruling Kulmiye party candidate Muse Bihi Abdi, who received 55% of the vote.

Background
Parliamentary elections were due originally to be held in Somaliland in September 2010, and were eventually scheduled for 26 June 2015 alongside the presidential elections, but due to the unpreparedness of the National elections Committee the Guurti extended the incumbent's term for a period of 21 months in early September 2015.

Candidates
In November 2015 Kulmiye party chairman Muse Bihi Abdi was selected as the presidential candidate for the ruling Peace, Unity, and Development Party. Former long-time House Speaker Abdirahman Mohamed Abdullahi, also known as Irro, was chosen as the candidate for the Waddani Party.

The candidate for the Justice and Development was Faysal Ali Warabe, who had unsuccessfully contested the two previous presidential elections. Warabe became the party's candidate after a long legal and political challenge between Warabe and the party's original presidential candidate Jamal Ali Hussein; Hussein later joined Kulmiye. Warabe's running mate was Abdi Ahmed Musa Abyan.

Conduct
Sixty international observers from over 27 countries were deployed across Somaliland to observe the elections. Seventeen of the 21 districts in Somaliland were visited by observers, with 335 of the 1,624 polling stations attended. The report by the Development Planning Unit of University College London concluded that "Throughout the election period, Somalilanders demonstrated their support for the rule of law and constitutional process, voting peacefully and in significant numbers and the mission applauds this ongoing commitment to peaceful participation in an impressively open electoral system."

Results
On 21 November the NEC announced that Muse Bihi Abdi of the ruling Kulmiye party polled 55.1% of votes to emerge winner. His closest contender was Abdirahman Irro of the Waddani party who polled 40.7% with Faysal Ali Warabe finishing last with 4.2% of votes.

By region

Aftermath
Abdi was inaugurated as president on 13 December 2017 in Hargeisa.

References

Elections in Somaliland
Somaliland
2017 in Somaliland
November 2017 events in Africa